Amphion is the name of several characters in Greek mythology.

Amphion may also refer to:

Ships 
Amphion (1778 ship), a pleasure craft owned by Gustav III of Sweden
Amphion class (disambiguation)
French ship Amphion (1749)
HMS Amphion, seven naval vessels
USS Amphion, two naval vessels

Other uses 
Amphion (horse) (1886–1906), a British Thoroughbred racehorse
Amphion (moth), a genus of hawk moths
Amphion (magazine), a Russian literary magazine from 1815 to 1816
Amphion, Texas
Amphion Loudspeakers, a Finnish manufacturer of loudspeakers